SP29 may refer to :
 Madrid Autonomous Community FIPS region code

SP-29 may refer to :
 SP-29 (Brazil), a State highway in Brazil
 USS Patrol No. 5 (SP-29), an armed motorboat that served in the United States Navy as a patrol vessel from 1917 to 1919